The Catholic Hour is a 60-minute American television drama anthology series produced by the National Broadcasting Company (NBC) and the National Council of Catholic Men. It premiered on October 1, 1951, and ran until 1967.

Among its writers were Rod Serling and James Costigan. Guest stars included Martin Sheen, Mildred Dunnock, Edward Mulhare, Eugene Roche, and Michael Constantine.

References

External links

1950s American anthology television series
1960s American anthology television series
1951 American television series debuts
1967 American television series endings
NBC original programming